The Iglesia de San Pedro Claver is a church located in Cartagena de Indias, in Colombia. This church and its convent are located in the Plaza de San Pedro Claver.

The church is part of a set of religious buildings that is complemented by the Cloister of San Pedro Claver and the archaeological museum. It was built between 1580 and 1654, in Spanish Colonial style. Originally known as the church of San Juan de Dios, it has been called the church of San Ignacio de Loyola since 1622 and is now known as San Pedro Claver.

The church is colonial, except for the dome, in 1921 the colonial dome was eliminated and the present dome was erected, the work of French Gaston Lelarge.

At its altar lie the remains of Saint Peter Claver, who died in 1654 in Cartagena, after devoting practically all his life to evangelizing and redeeming the black slaves of New Granada.

On May 7, 2022 the Church formally dedicated a new mausoleum. The structure is 2 stories and uses existing space that dwells behind the resting place of the Saint. The mausoleum construction was donated by philanthropists Dr. Jaime Rodriguez Torres and Miami Investor Burt Connelly.

Description
It suffered many vicissitudes after the expulsion of the Jesuits, first ordered by Charles III of Spain in 1767, and then in the years 1850 and 1861, during the early years of the republican era. For many years it served as a park to the adjacent barracks, which occupied part of the house-school of the Company of Jesus.

Its architecture corresponds to the style called "Jesuitic", of type denominated "of preaching". Much of the façade was carved in stone from the island of Tierrabomba, and inside, at the bottom of the marble main altar imported from Italy by Bishop Eugenio Biffi, lie the relics of the owner in a golden bronze and glass urn, gift of Pope Leo XIII.

In 1921 the typical orange half was eliminated and the present dome, the work of Lelarge, was erected. The front of the church departs from the Baroque style of other entrances. There is a second floor above the chapels, which are intercommunicated through arches of half point and covered with arista vaults. This church has an organ and a choir similar to those of the Archbasilica of St. John Lateran in Rome.

The interior of the church of the Company is distinguished by the severity of its architectural elements, in contrast to the Baroque profusion used by Jesuits in other parts of Spanish America. Its facade is considered as the richest and most monumental of Cartagena.

See also
List of colonial buildings in Cartagena, Colombia
 List of Jesuit sites

References

External links

Roman Catholic churches in Cartagena, Colombia
Spanish Colonial architecture in Colombia
1654 establishments in the Spanish Empire
Roman Catholic churches completed in 1654
17th-century Roman Catholic church buildings in Colombia